Pieter Franz Stemmet (born 18 February 1992) is a South African rugby union player, currently playing with Romanian SuperLiga side Timișoara Saracens. His regular position is prop.

Career

Youth
He represented  at the 2005 Under-13 Craven Week tournament and the 2008 Under-16 Grant Khomo Week, which led to his inclusion in the Under-16 Elite Squad in the same year. He played in the 2009 Under-18 Academy Week tournament and in an S.A. Academy side in the Under-18 Craven Week tournament in the same year.

He was also named in the senior Vodacom Cup squad, but didn't make an appearance.

Western Province
He came on as a substitute just after half-time and scored a debut try at the end of the game in his only appearance for Western Province.

Eastern Province Kings

Pumas
However, he failed to make an appearance for the Pumas.

References

External links

 
 

South African rugby union players
Living people
Sportspeople from Paarl
1992 births
Eastern Province Elephants players
Western Province (rugby union) players
Rugby union props
Rugby union players from the Western Cape